Bekovo is the name of several inhabited localities in Russia.

Urban localities
Bekovo, Penza Oblast, a work settlement in Bekovsky District of Penza Oblast

Rural localities
Bekovo, Kemerovo Oblast, a selo in Belovsky District of Kemerovo Oblast
Bekovo, Tyumen Oblast, a selo in Sladkovsky District of Tyumen Oblast
Bekovo, Leningrad Oblast, a village in Luzhsky District of Leningrad Oblast

References